Alexey Vladimirovich Ryzhkov (Russian:Алексей Владимирович Рыжков; born 20 December 1972), known as the Rubtsovsk Ripper, is a Russian serial killer who raped and murdered four women and a teenage girl in Rubtsovsk, Russia, between 2000 and 2001. He was caught by police shortly after murdering his last victim, and subsequently sentenced to life imprisonment.

Early life 
At an early age, Ryzhkov was diagnosed with a learning disability. Because of this, he was held back several times, which led to his classmates bullying him and his teachers mocking him. After sixth grade, Ryzhkov dropped out of school and later committed two robberies. He was released from prison when he was 27-years-old. Shortly afterwards, he was arrested again for fraud, but released in August 2000.

Murders 
In November 2000, Ryzhkov murdered "Natalya," who was walking to her friend's house. Her corpse was found between two outbuildings. She had been raped and strangled to death. The body of his second victim was discovered in an elevator shaft. The third victim was a 60-year-old woman. In December 2000, Ryzhkov murdered a 16-year-old girl. After volunteering to walk her home, he raped and strangled her to death. On 16 January 2001, he murdered a prostitute after drinking moonshine. He then raped her body several times at the entrance of an apartment building. A witness saw Ryzhkov with the victim at his feet, but Ryzhkov claimed it was his drunk wife.

Arrest and convictions 
Ryzhkov was initially interviewed as a witness because one of his victims was his neighbor.  When investigators interviewed other witnesses, they claimed to have seen a tall young man close to where the murders occurred. Because of this, suspicion fell on Ryzhkov. Ryzhkov soon confessed to the murders while being interrogated. Investigators also questioned him about other murders in Barnaul, but he was in prison at the time of those murders. Ryzhkov also showed the police where he hid the body of one of his victims, who had been reported missing at that time. Some of his victims belongings, such as gold earrings and clothing, were found with a distant relative of Ryzhkov. 

On 4 September 2001, Ryzhkov was found guilty and sentenced to life imprisonment. He was reportedly calm as the verdict was being read, and said he didn't intend to appeal it.

See also 

 Crime in Russia
 List of Russian serial killers

References 

Living people
Russian serial killers
2000 murders in Russia
Russian male criminals
Prisoners sentenced to life imprisonment by Russia
People convicted of murder by Russia

1972 births
Russian robbers
Russian people convicted of murder
Necrophiles
2001 murders in Russia
Crimes against sex workers
Russian rapists
21st-century Russian criminals
Male serial killers